Who Framed Roger Rabbit is a 1988 American comedy film directed by Robert Zemeckis.

Who Framed Roger Rabbit may also refer to:
 Who Framed Roger Rabbit (1988 video game), a video game for the DOS, Amiga, Atari ST, Apple II and Commodore 64 computers released by Buena Vista Software
 Who Framed Roger Rabbit (1989 video game), a video game for the Nintendo Entertainment System by Rare and published by LJN Toys
 Who Framed Roger Rabbit (1991 video game), a video game for the Game Boy released by Capcom

See also 
 List of Who Framed Roger Rabbit media
 Who Censored Roger Rabbit?, novel and basis for the film
 Roger Rabbit (disambiguation)